Nikhil Rathi (born 5 August 1979)  is the chief executive of the UK's Financial Conduct Authority (FCA).

Early life
Rathi is of Indian descent, and grew up in Barrow-in-Furness, Cumbria, the son of Madhu and Dr Rajendra Rathi, a local magistrate, having moved there aged three. He was educated at Chetwynde School, followed by St Anne's College, Oxford, where he earned a first class degree in Philosophy, Politics and Economics. He was Cumbria under-12 tennis champion.

Career
From 2005 to 2008, Rathi was Private Secretary to UK Prime Ministers Tony Blair and Gordon Brown.

Rathi worked for HM Treasury from 2009 and 2014, and was director of the financial services group, leading the UK's EU and international financial services interests.

In May 2014, Rathi joined the London Stock Exchange (LSE) as chief of staff and director of international development, and in 2015, was appointed CEO.

In June 2020, HM Treasury appointed Rathi to be the new chief executive at the FCA, succeeding Andrew Bailey, after his appointment as the Governor at the Bank of England in March 2020, and Christopher Woolard, who acted as interim CEO. Rathi took over in October 2020.

Personal life
Rathi is married, with three children, and lives in London.

References

Living people
Financial Conduct Authority people
London Stock Exchange people
People from Barrow-in-Furness
Alumni of St Anne's College, Oxford
1979 births